Robert Walker Crumley (20 May 1876 – 27 January 1949) was a Scottish professional footballer who made over 130 appearances in the Scottish League for Dundee as a goalkeeper.

Personal life 
Crumley's younger brother James was also a goalkeeper. After service with the Gordon Highlanders during the Second Boer War, Crumley served as a sergeant in the Black Watch during the First World War and saw action on the Western Front and at Salonika. He ended the war in the Labour Corps. Crumley received a war pension for malaria and rheumatism.

Career statistics

Honours 
Dundee

 Scottish Cup: 1909–10

References 

British Army personnel of World War I
Scottish footballers
Newcastle United F.C. players
1876 births
1949 deaths
Footballers from Dundee
Association football goalkeepers
Black Watch soldiers
English Football League players
Lochee United F.C. players
Dundee F.C. players
Arbroath F.C. players
Darlington F.C. players
Scottish Football League players
Gordon Highlanders soldiers
Scottish Junior Football Association players

Royal Pioneer Corps soldiers